Charles Hall Grandgent  (born November 14, 1862 in Dorchester, Massachusetts; died September 11, 1939 in Cambridge, Massachusetts) was an American romance philologist and Italian scholar.

Life and work 
Grandgent studied at Harvard University and graduated in 1883. He was a high school teacher at first. From 1896 until 1932 he was Professor in Romanistics at Harvard University. From 1902 until 1911 he was secretary of the Modern Language Association, and in 1912 its president. In 1923 he became honorary president of the American Association of Teachers of Italian at its foundation.
 
The Dante Society of America confers The Charles Hall Grandgent Award yearly.

Works 
 Italian grammar, Boston 1887, 1889, 1891, 1892,1903, 1904; (with Ernest Hatch Wilkins) 1915, 1944
Vowel measurements, Baltimore 1890 (Publications of the Modern Language Association of America. Supplement to vol. V. no. 2, 1890, S. 148-174) 
(with Richard Hochdörfer) German and English sounds, Boston 1892
A Short French Grammar, Boston 1894, 1905
English in America, in: Die Neueren Sprachen, 1895,  S. 443-467, 520-533
The essentials of French grammar, Boston 1900, 1903, 1904, 1906, 1908
Italian composition, Boston 1904
An outline of the phonology and morphology of old provençal, Boston 1905
An introduction to vulgar Latin, Boston 1907, New York 1962, Honolulu 2002 (Italian: Milan 1914, 1976, Spanish: Madrid 1928, 1952, 1963) 
(reprint) Dante, La Divina Commedia, Boston 1911, 1933
(with Raymond Weeks und James W. Bright) The N.E.A. phonetic alphabet with a review of the Whipple experiments, Lancaster, Pa. 1912
Dante, New York 1916, 1921 (Folcroft 1973), 1966; London 1920
The Ladies of Dante's lyrics, Cambridge, Massachusetts 1917
The Power of Dante (Eight lectures), London/Cambridge, Massachusetts 1920
Old and New. Sundry papers, Cambridge, Massachusetts 1920
Discourses on Dante, Cambridge, Massachusetts 1924, New York 1970
Getting a laugh, and other essays, Cambridge, Massachusetts 1924, 1952, Freeport, N.Y. 1971
From Latin to Italian. An historical outline of the phonology and morphology of the Italian language, Cambridge, Massachusetts 1927, 1940
Prunes and prism, with other odds and ends, Cambridge, Massachusetts 1928, Freeport, N.J. 1971
The new world, Cambridge, Massachusetts 1929
Imitation and other essays, Cambridge, Massachusetts 1933
Companion to the Divine Comedy. Commentary, hrsg. von Charles S. Singleton, Cambridge, Massachusetts 1975

Literature 
George Luther Lincoln: A bibliography of Charles Hall Grandgent's writings, arranged chronologically, in: PMLA  47, 1932, S. 911-914
To Charles Hall Grandgent, Urbana, Ill. 1933
Charles Hall Grandgent, in: Italica 12, 1935,  S. 176-178
Henry Grattan Doyle: Charles Hall Grandgent. An appreciation, in: The Modern Language Journal 19, 1935, S. 615
Jeremiah Denis Matthias Ford: Charles Hall Grandgent, in: Publications of the Modern Language Association of America 54, 1939, S. 1400-1402
James McKeen Cattell, Leaders in education, a biographical directory,  New York 1932, S. 367-368

References

External links 
 http://www.issawiki.org/wiki/index.php?title=%7E_Charles_H._Grandgent_(1862-1939),_United_States
 http://www.aati-online.org/

1862 births
1939 deaths
Harvard University alumni
Harvard University faculty
Fellows of the Medieval Academy of America
People from Dorchester, Massachusetts
Linguistic Society of America presidents
Presidents of the Modern Language Association